Pellston is a village in Emmet County in the U.S. state of Michigan. The population was 822 at the 2010 census. The village is the home of Pellston Regional Airport.

The village lies on the boundary between Maple River and McKinley townships on US Highway 31. The University of Michigan Biological Station is on nearby Douglas Lake.

Demographics

The University of Michigan has its biological station in Pellston.

2010 census
As of the census of 2010, there were 822 people, 308 households, and 216 families residing in the village. The racial makeup of the village was 86.5% White, 0.2% African American, 8.0% Native American, 0.1% Asian, 0.2% from other races, and 4.9% from two or more races. Hispanic or Latino of any race were 1.9% of the population.

There were 308 households, of which 41.9% had children under the age of 18 living with them, 47.1% were married couples living together, 16.6% had a female householder with no husband present, 6.5% had a male householder with no wife present, and 29.9% were non-families. 24.0% of all households were made up of individuals, and 7.4% had someone living alone who was 65 years of age or older. The average household size was 2.67 and the average family size was 3.13.

The median age in the village was 34.1 years. 30.8% of residents were under the age of 18; 7.6% were between the ages of 18 and 24; 25.4% were from 25 to 44; 26.9% were from 45 to 64; and 9.2% were 65 years of age or older. The gender makeup of the village was 48.8% male and 51.2% female.

2000 census
As of the census of 2000, there were 771 people, 260 households, and 199 families residing in the village. The racial makeup of the village was 89.75% White, 0.65% African American, 6.49% Native American, 0.26% Asian, 0.13% Pacific Islander, and 2.72% from two or more races. Hispanic or Latino of any race were 0.78% of the population.

There were 260 households, out of which 43.5% had children under the age of 18 living with them, 60.0% were married couples living together, 11.2% had a female householder with no husband present, and 23.1% were non-families. 16.9% of all households were made up of individuals, and 5.8% had someone living alone who was 65 years of age or older.  The average household size was 2.97 and the average family size was 3.33.

In the village, the population was spread out, with 33.3% under the age of 18, 6.9% from 18 to 24, 32.6% from 25 to 44, 18.3% from 45 to 64, and 8.9% who were 65 years of age or older.  The median age was 31 years. For every 100 females, there were 98.7 males.  For every 100 females age 18 and over, there were 94.0 males.

The median income for a household in the village was $37,292, and the median income for a family was $39,911. Males had a median income of $25,956 versus $20,013 for females. The per capita income for the village was $13,047.  About 10.8% of families and 13.7% of the population were below the poverty line, including 14.0% of those under age 18 and 13.0% of those age 65 or over.

Geography

Climate 
According to the Köppen Climate Classification system, Pellston has a humid continental climate, abbreviated "Dfb" on climate maps.

Education
Pellston Public Schools is the area school district.

Transportation
Indian Trails provides daily intercity bus service between St. Ignace and East Lansing, Michigan.

Delta Air Lines provides airline service to Detroit Metropolitan Wayne County Airport.

Images

References

Villages in Emmet County, Michigan
Villages in Michigan